Many different electrical connectors have been used to connect microphones to audio equipment—including PA systems, radios, tape recorders, and numerous other devices.

Phone connectors

Photo: 2.5 mm mono (TS), 3.5 mm mono and stereo (TRS), and 1/4″ (6.35 mm) stereo (TRS) phone connectors
The most common microphone connector in consumer use is the venerable phone connector, in 1/4" (6.35 mm), 3.5 mm, and 2.5 mm sizes, and in both mono and stereo configurations. 
Not all microphone plugs with 3-segment TRS (Tip-Ring-Sleeve) connectors are actually stereo. Most computer microphones use the third segment to carry bias power for the microphone.

Type "O" 1930s connectors
These round connectors are about 1 inch in diameter. They were in common use in the later 40's and thru the 50's at WELI, New Haven Connecticut. see: http://terryking.us/OldRadio/OP-4-RCA-RemoteAmplifier-1934-Rear.jpg  The 3 connectors on the left are 1934 type "P" round microphone connectors. They look like this: http://terryking.us/OldRadio/P-CG-12S.jpg

Type "UA" 1950s–1960s professional connectors
These were "D" shaped upgrades of the old P connectors, with gold plated pins and sockets.   They looked like this: http://terryking.us/OldRadio/UA-3-12.jpg

SwitchCraft 2501F/2501M
This is the part number for a Swichcraft connector used with high impedance microphones up through about 1980.  It was intended for coax style cable up to  outside diameter.

Attachment is made with a 5/8-27 threaded ring that can be unthreaded over the body of the connector body allowing the female connector to become a male connector.

Wire connection was via solder.  The center conductor is soldered to a hole resulting in a flat center contact.  The cable shield is soldered to the strain-relief spring which is held in the body of the connector with a set screw.

With no provision for spring loading of the connection ring, vibration tends to loosen the threaded ring and create intermittent contact.

Amphenol 80 and 91 series
Popular microphone connector from 1930s to 1980s, originally manufactured by Amphenol.  
Amphenol sold this production to WPI Interconnect in early 1980s.
The Amphenol 80-MC2M, which mates with the 80-PC2F, microphone connector was popular with American radio manufacturers (1950s to 1970s).

XLR connectors (mid-50s to today)

Most commonly used on professional microphones, the common 3-pin XLR connector is a standard for transferring balanced audio among professional audio equipment.

The 4-pin XLR is the standard connector for intercom headsets, such as systems made by Clear-Com and Telex. Two pins are used for the mono headphone signal and two pins for the unbalanced microphone signal.

The 4-pin XLR connector is also commonly used on amateur radio microphones, but transferring unbalanced audio instead, and using the 4th pin (with the common ground) for a push-to-talk (PTT) circuit activated by a button on the microphone. Some broadcast radio professionals also use these microphones, instead using the PTT circuit as a cough button (a momentary mute button) so that they may cough, clear their throat, or make comments to others in the studio without the sounds being broadcast. It is also used for dmx512 digital stage controls.

Multi-pin circular connector (Marushin, MCC, CBC series, Foster, GX-16)
First used in the 1970s by Japanese radio manufacturers as an alternative to the German DIN connector standard for microphone connectors on citizens band and amateur radio equipment, these screw-on circular connectors are available with 2, 3, 4, 5, 6, 7, or 8 pins. They are often used for other purposes as well, for example, 2-pin connectors used for DC power in 1970s Kenwood mobile radios and soldering stations from Eastern Asian manufacturers in the 1990s using the connector for the iron/handpiece.

As reported by Philmore-Datel (LKG Industries of Rockford, Illinois), the American importer and distributor of these connectors, the original Japanese manufacturer, Foster, ceased production. Due to the loss of factories in the 2011 Tōhoku earthquake and tsunami, connector manufacturing moved from Japan to Taiwan and mainland China.

Marushing Electric Mfg. Co., Ltd. in Kanagawa, Japan, the original 1950s producer of the connector type, still continues manufacturing. Japanese communications equipment manufacturers such as Icom and Yaesu Musen have used Marushin connectors in their products.

These connectors are sold under a variety of generic names: CB connector, mobile connector, microphone connector, power connector. Sometimes they are misidentified as XLR connectors.

Chinese mainland and Taiwan manufacturers adopted this connector as the GX16 (16 mm) for power and avionics usage. The Chinese GX series is used as a multi-voltage connector for soldering stations, avionics, marine equipment etc.

The manufacturer Renhotec has standardized the GX series in a variety of sizes named after the diameter of the connector (in mm): GX12, GX16, GX20, GX25, GX30, GX35, GX40.

Even though this circular connector is largely standardized, there is no industry standard for wiring or pin usage. The individual pin assignments to specific functions varies from manufacturer to manufacturer. For example, in amateur radio, Icom, Kenwood, and Yaesu radios have used the 8-pin screw-on connector, yet microphones from one brand are incompatible with the other two brands, at least without the use of an adapter cable in between the microphone and the radio.

Modular connectors
Although originally designed for telephone usage and later adopted for computer networking, the modular connector has been used for microphone connections extensively on modern amateur radio equipment, including models from the three major manufacturers (Icom, Kenwood, and Yaesu), but primarily used on mobile radio equipment (designed to be mounted in vehicles).

Like the screw-on round microphone connectors, there is little standardization among manufacturers, and even among different models from the same manufacturer, leading to significant interoperability problems when connecting non-OEM or homebrew microphones and other equipment.

Most radios with modular microphone connectors use the 8P8C (vernacular: RJ45) connector, but some use 6P6C or 4P4C connectors.

References

Microphones
Electrical signal connectors